Phil or Philip Boyce may refer to:

Phil Boyce, American radio executive
Philip Boyce (bishop) (born 1940), Irish bishop
Philip Boyce (psychiatrist) (born 1949), Australian psychiatrist
Philip Boyce (Star Trek), fictional character